Kasumi (written: , lit. Notable people with the name include:

, Japanese actress
, Japanese table tennis player
, Japanese model, gravure idol and actress
, Japanese long-distance runner
, Japanese boxer
, Japanese actress
Kasumi Takahashi (born 1980), Japanese-Australian rhythmic gymnast
, Japanese actress and model

Fictional characters
, a character in the video game series Dead or Alive
, better known as Misty, a character in the media franchise Pokémon
 Kasumi, an alternative name of Cassandra Cain, a character in DC Comics
 Kasumi Goto, a character in the video game Mass Effect 2
, a character in the novel The Kouga Ninja Scrolls
, a character in the anime series Tama and Friends
, the protagonist of Fist of the Blue Sky and the uncle of Kenshiro, also known as Yan Wang
, a character in the tokusatsu series Shuriken Sentai Ninninger
, a character in the media franchise Love Live! Nijigasaki High School Idol Club
, a character in the manga series Ranma ½
, a character in the video game series Art of Fighting
, a character in the media franchise BanG Dream!
, a character in the video game Persona 5 Royal
, a character in the video game Fallout 4 DLC "Far Harbor"
, a character in Bofuri.
, a character in the manga and anime series Jujutsu Kaisen.
, better known as Haze/Fan la Norne in the video game Xenoblade Chronicles 2

Japanese feminine given names